Nowy Borek may refer to the following places:
Nowy Borek, Podlaskie Voivodeship (north-east Poland)
Nowy Borek, Subcarpathian Voivodeship (south-east Poland)
Nowy Borek, West Pomeranian Voivodeship (north-west Poland)